Avalanche Alley is a 2001 live action Canadian television film directed by Paul Ziller and starring Ed Marinaro, Nick Mancuso, Kirsten Robek and Wolf Larson.

Premise
Rick (Ed Marinaro) is not having a good day. His small ski resort is going bankrupt and the investors have pulled out. His resort manager is drunk. His young, beautiful and possibly unfaithful wife is buried alive in an ice tomb. And last, but not least, an avalanche is going to bury the lodge if he doesn't disarm seven bombs in less than two hours. But it's a great day for snowboarding.

Cast
 Ed Marinaro as Rick
 Nick Mancuso as Scott
 Lauren K. Robek as Lauren
 Wolf Larson as Alex
 Tobias Mehler as Simon
 Kirby Morrow as Jake
 Miranda Frigon as Tami
 Cholo Burns as "Scoob"
 Mark Holmes as Willie

External links
 
 

2000s English-language films
Canadian action films
Canadian television films
2001 television films
2001 films
Disaster television films
English-language Canadian films
Avalanches in film
Films directed by Paul Ziller
2000s Canadian films